La Mazzanta is a resort town in Tuscany, central Italy, in the comune of Rosignano Marittimo, province of Livorno. At the time of the 2001 census its population was 148.

The town is about 30 km from Livorno and 12 km from Rosignano Marittimo.

References

Bibliography 
 

Frazioni of the Province of Livorno